Lantana pastazensis is a species of flowering plant in the verbena family, Verbenaceae, that is endemic to Ecuador.  Its natural habitat is lowland tropical moist forests. It is mildly toxic due to the presence of pentacyclic terpenoids.

Etymology
The name Lantana derives from the Latin name of the wayfaring tree Viburnum lantana, the flowers of which closely resemble Lantana.

References

pastazensis
Plants described in 1982
Endemic flora of Ecuador
Vulnerable plants
Taxonomy articles created by Polbot